A value judgment (or value judgement) is a judgment of the rightness or wrongness of something or someone, or of the usefulness of something or someone, based on a comparison or other relativity. As a generalization, a value judgment can refer to a judgment based upon a particular set of values or on a particular value system. A related meaning of value judgment is an expedient evaluation based upon limited information at hand, where said evaluation was undertaken because a decision had to be made on short notice.

Explanation
A value judgment is a thought about something based on what it “ought” or “should” be given an opinion about what counts as “good” or “bad” — contrast from a thought based on what the facts are. E.g. “The government should improve access to education” is a value judgement (that education is good). “People will buy less of our products if our price goes up” is not a value judgement because it is based on the fact that people tend to buy less of a more expensive product. It can be used either in a positive sense, signifying that a judgment must be made taking a value system into account, or in a disparaging sense, signifying a judgment made by personal whim rather than objective thought or evidence.

In its positive sense, a recommendation to make a value judgment is an admonition to consider carefully, to avoid whim and impetuousness, and search for consonance with one's deeper convictions, and to search for an objective, verifiable, public, and consensual set of evidence for the opinion.

In its disparaging sense the term value judgment implies a conclusion is insular, one-sided, and not objective — contrasting with judgments based upon deliberation, balance and public evidence.

Value judgment also can refer to a tentative judgment based on a considered appraisal of the information at hand, taken to be incomplete and evolving—for example, a value judgment on whether to launch a military attack or as to procedure in a medical emergency. In this case the quality of judgment suffers because the information available is incomplete as a result of exigency, rather than as a result of cultural or personal limitations.

Most commonly the term value judgment refers to an individual's opinion. Of course, the individual's opinion is formed to a degree by their belief system and the culture to which they belong. So a natural extension of the term value judgment is to include declarations seen one way from one value system but may be seen differently from another. Conceptually this extension of the definition is related both to the anthropological axiom "cultural relativism" (that is, that cultural meaning derives from a context) and to the term "moral relativism" (that is, that moral and ethical propositions are not universal truths, but stem from cultural context). A  value judgment formed within a specific value system may be parochial and may be subject to dispute in a wider audience.

Value-neutral
Value-neutral is a related adjective suggesting independence from a value system. The object itself is considered value-neutral when it is neither good nor bad, neither useful nor useless, neither significant nor trite until placed in some social context. For example, the classification of an object sometimes depends upon context: Whether or not an object is a tool or a weapon, or if human remains are an artifact or an ancestor.

Max Weber put forward one of the first concepts of value-neutrality.

A famous quote from mathematician G.H. Hardy indicates how he places the "value-neutral" subject of mathematics into a particular social context: "A science is said to be useful if its development tends to accentuate the existing inequalities of wealth, or more directly promotes the destruction of human life".

For a discussion of whether technology is value neutral, see Martin and Schinzinger, and Wallace.

An item may have value and be value-neutral regardless of social context if its utility or importance is more-or-less self-evident, for example, oxygen supports life in all societies.

Value judgments and their context
Some argue that true objectivity is impossible, that even the most rigorous rational analysis is founded on the set of values accepted in the course of analysis.
 
Consequently, all conclusions are necessarily value judgments (and therefore may be parochial). Of course, putting all conclusions in one category does nothing to distinguish between them, and is, therefore, a useless descriptor. Categorizing a conclusion as a value judgment takes substance when the context framing the judgment is specified.

As an example, scientific "truths" are considered objective but are held tentatively, with the understanding that more careful evidence and/or wider experience might change matters. Further, a scientific view (in the sense of a conclusion based upon a value system) is a value judgment that is socially constructed based upon rigorous evaluation and wide consensus. With this example in mind, characterizing a view as a value judgment is vague without a description of the context surrounding it.

However, as noted in the first segment of this article, in common usage the term value judgment has a much simpler meaning with context simply implied, not specified.

See also

 Aesthetic judgment
 Critic
 Cultural relativism
 Fact–value distinction
 Immanent evaluation
 Moral relativism

Notes and references

Further reading

Axiology
Political concepts
Social concepts
Social constructionism
Continental philosophy
20th-century philosophy
Judgment
Concepts in aesthetics